Walter Joseph Meserve (born March 10, 1923) is an American professor emeritus, playwright, critic, and  author of books on theater. He is a Fellow of the National Endowment for the Humanities.

Meserve's An Outline History of American Drama has been called "a highly valuable "vest pocket" history of the American drama which should be on the shelf of every teacher of contemporary theater, every critic, and every student with an interest in modern drama". The American Historical Review said his book about American drama during the Andrew Jackson era "brings much of Quinn's carefulness and Odell's enthusiasm to embroidering their work", but added that "Meserve's gestures to the new are disappointingly fainthearted".

Bibliography
Fateful Lightning America's Civil War Plays, June 18, 2000 with Mollie Ann Meserve
When Conscience Trod the Stage: American Plays of Social Awareness, April 1, 1998 with Mollie Ann Meserve
On Stage America: A Selection of Distinctly American Plays, August 1, 1996
An Outline History of American Drama, 1965, 1994
The Musical Theatre Cookbook: Recipes from Best-Loved Musicals, January 1, 1994 with Mollie Ann Meserve 
A Chronological Outline of World Theatre, Apr 1, 1992 with Mollie Ann Meserve
Heralds of Promise: The Drama of the American People During the Age of Jackson, 1829-1849 (Contributions in American Studies)  1986
American drama to 1900: A guide to information sources, 1980
An emerging entertainment: The drama of the American people to 1828, 1977
Modern Drama From Communist China, 1975

References

1923 births
Living people
20th-century American educators
20th-century American dramatists and playwrights
American male dramatists and playwrights
20th-century American historians
American male non-fiction writers
Date of birth missing (living people)
Place of birth missing (living people)
Fellows of the National Endowment for the Humanities
20th-century American male writers